Jenah District is a district (bakhsh) in Bastak County, Hormozgan Province, Iran. At the 2006 census, its population was 22,116, in 4,607 families.  The District has one city: Jenah.  The District has two rural districts (dehestan): Faramarzan Rural District and Jenah Rural District.

References 

Districts of Hormozgan Province
Bastak County